The 1948 Wimbledon Championships took place on the outdoor grass courts at the All England Lawn Tennis and Croquet Club in Wimbledon, London, United Kingdom. The tournament was held from Monday 21 June until Saturday 3 July. It was the 62nd staging of the Wimbledon Championships, and the third Grand Slam tennis event of 1948. Bob Falkenburg and Louise Brough won the singles titles.

Finals

Seniors

Men's singles

 Bob Falkenburg defeated  John Bromwich, 7–5, 0–6, 6–2, 3–6, 7–5

Women's singles

 Louise Brough defeated  Doris Hart, 6–3, 8–6

Men's doubles

 John Bromwich /  Frank Sedgman defeated  Tom Brown /  Gardnar Mulloy, 5–7, 7–5, 7–5, 9–7

Women's doubles

 Louise Brough /  Margaret Osborne duPont defeated  Doris Hart /  Patricia Todd, 6–3, 3–6, 6–3

Mixed doubles

 John Bromwich /  Louise Brough defeated  Doris Hart /  Frank Sedgman, 6–2, 3–6, 6–3

Juniors

Boys' singles

 Staffan Stockenberg defeated  Dezső Vad, 6–0, 6–8, 5–7, 6–4, 6–2

Girls' singles

 Olga Mišková defeated  Violette Rigollet, 6–4, 6–2

References

External links
 Official Wimbledon Championships website

 
Wimbledon Championships
Wimbledon Championships
Wimbledon Championships
Wimbledon Championships